Clubiona trivialis is a small reddish brown spider with holarctic distribution. It is found in exposed places on low vegetation. Adults can be found throughout the year.

References
 Koch, C. L. 1843. Die Arachniden. Nürnberg, Zehnter Band, pp. 37–142.

External links

Canadian Arachnology Profile
C. trivialis in Denmark 

Clubionidae
Spiders described in 1843
Spiders of Europe
Holarctic spiders